Davit Kezerashvili (born September 22, 1978) is a Jewish-Georgian investor, entrepreneur, media tycoon and former statesman who was the Minister of Defense of Georgia under Mikheil Saakashvili's presidency.

Biography
Kezerashvili was born in Tbilisi to a Jewish family. After migrating to Russia, he went to Israel in 1992, where he lived with his grandmother in the Kiryat Ben-Gurion neighborhood of Holon and attended high school. After a year and a half, he left Israel and returned to Georgia.
He studied law and international relations at Tbilisi State University. 

After working in the Justice Ministry he became an assistant to Mikheil Saakashvili, then the Minister for Justice.

Kezerashvili then worked in the Finance Ministry from 2004 until November 2006, including a role as chair of the financial police force. On November 11, 2006, he was appointed as Georgian Defense Minister. He was dismissed from this post amid criticisms over the Georgia-Russia war on December 5, 2008.

On September 3, 2019, Kezerashvili bought control packet of shares of TV Formula, a pro-opposition Georgian TV channel.

Political track record
Kezerashvili is a founding member of the  United National Movement, and contested an election in 2002 under their banner. He is also a close personal ally of the party's leader, Georgian President Saakashvili.

He was criticized by opposition but supported by western allies for his achievements in reforming defense institutions. 

Kezerashvili was dismissed from his post of the defence minister on December 5, 2008 during a major cabinet shuffle. His dismissal was expected in the aftermath of Georgia's defeat in the 2008 South Ossetia War. Davit Kezerashvili is succeeded by former ambassador to the US, Vasil Sikharulidze.

Conviction

According to the Swiss outlet Tribune de Genève, Kezerashvili's trustees registered three offshore shell companies into which he moved millions of dollars two days after his resignation from the post of defence minister of Georgia. He also left the country afterwards.

After the change of power in Georgia in 2012, the new government opened investigation against Kezerashvili. He was accused of embezzling €5 million ($5.2 million) during his tenure as defence minister under the auspices of a combat training project.

Kezerashvili was acquitted of embezzlement by Tbilisi City Court and Tbilisi Court of Appeals. However, in September 2021, the Supreme Court of Georgia overturned both acquittals, found Kezerashvili guilty, and sentenced him to 10 years in prison in absentia. Due to the amnesty, he would serve only 5 years in prison.

After 2012, a total of seven criminal cases were brought against Kezerashvili. He was only found guilty in one case.

Living in the United Kingdom, Kezerashvili has managed to avoid prison sentence. In October 2013, Kezerashvili was detained on Interpol warrant in France, the Georgian government seeking his extradition. The Aix-en-Provence city court ruled against his extradition and Kezerashvili was released in early 2014. INTERPOL declared a search for Kezerashvili by red notice in 2014. However, INTERPOL revoked its red notice the next year. In 2016, the United Kingdom also refused to extradite Kezerashvili to Georgia.

It has been reported that the State Prosecutor’s Office of Israel for Tax and Financial Crimes may also charge Kezerashvili for corruption.

Notes

See also
Foreign relations of Georgia (country)
Politics of Georgia

1978 births
Living people
Military personnel from Georgia (country)
Jews from Georgia (country)
People of the Russo-Georgian War
Politicians from Tbilisi
United National Movement (Georgia) politicians
Government ministers of Georgia (country)